Shrinkage may refer to:

Reduction in size of a solid material

Shrinkage (casting), size reduction of liquid metal as it solidifies
Shrinkage (concrete), size reduction of concrete as it sets and ages
Shrinkage (fabric), size reduction of fabric when washed with water or hot water
Shrinkage (wood), size reduction of wood as it dries

Other uses

Shrinkage (accounting), loss of product inventory due to theft, damage, spoilage, etc.
Shrinkage defect or shrinkage void, a casting defect caused by metal solidifying from the outside inward
Shrinkage (statistics), a technique to improve an estimator
Shrinkage (slang)

See also
Degrowth
Downsizing (disambiguation)
Human penis size
Miniaturization
Resizing (fiction)
Shrink (disambiguation)
Swelling (disambiguation) (opposite of shrinkage)